San Félix de Arce (Astur-Leonese: San Feles) is a locality located in the municipality of Cabrillanes, in León province, Castile and León, Spain. As of 2020, it has a population of 22.

Geography 
San Félix de Arce is located 84km northwest of León, Spain.

References

Populated places in the Province of León